Amélie Mauresmo was the defending champion, but lost in the semifinals to Justine Henin-Hardenne.

Kim Clijsters won in the final 7–5, 6–1, against Justine Henin-Hardenne.

Seeds
The top eight seeds received a bye into the second round. 

  Maria Sharapova (withdrew due to a right pectoralis muscle strain)
  Amélie Mauresmo (semifinals)
  Svetlana Kuznetsova (third round)
  Justine Henin-Hardenne (final)
  Serena Williams (third round, withdrew due to left knee pain)
  Nadia Petrova (quarterfinals, retired due to a right pectoralis strain)
  Kim Clijsters (champion)
  Mary Pierce (withdrew due to a right thigh strain)
  Anastasia Myskina (semifinals)
  Nathalie Dechy (second round)
  Jelena Janković (first round)
  Ana Ivanovic (third round, withdrew due to a right pectoralis strain)
  Daniela Hantuchová (first round, retired due to heat illness)
  Flavia Pennetta (quarterfinals)
  Dinara Safina (second round)
  Tatiana Golovin (second round)
  Ai Sugiyama (second round)

Draw

Finals

Top half

Section 1

Section 2

Bottom half

Section 3

Section 4

External links
Draw and Qualifying Draw

Cup - Singles